Michael Ball (born 1962) is an English singer, actor and broadcaster.

Michael Ball may also refer to:

 Michael Ball (album), 1992 studio album by Michael Ball
 Michael Ball (TV programme), British music entertainment television programme presented by Michael Ball  that aired on ITV from 1993 to 1995
 Michael Ball (footballer) (born 1979), English footballer
 Michael Ball (American football) (born 1964), retired American football player
 Michael Ball (bishop) (born 1932), Bishop of Truro, 1990–1997
 Michael Ball (fashion), CEO of Rock and Republic
 Michael Ball (actor) (born 1943)

See also
 Mike Ball (born 1954), Alabama politician

Ball, Michael